Dhiru Ishwarlal Parikh (31 August 1933 – 9 May 2021) was an Indian Gujarati poet, short story writer and critic. He was an editor of Kavilok and Kumar, Gujarati literary magazines.

Biography

Dhiru Parikh was born on 31 August 1933 at Viramgam near Ahmedabad, Gujarat, India. He completed his matriculation in 1951 from the town. He completed B.A. in 1955 from L. D. Arts College, M.A. in 1958 from Gujarat University and was awarded Ph.D. in 1967 for his thesis, Rasyugma Prakruti Nirupan. Since 1955, he taught at C. U. Shah College. He served as the principal of Mahila Arts College of Wadhwan affiliated with SNDT Women's University from 1967 to 1969. Later he joined as a professor of Department of Gujarati, School of Languages, Gujarat University in 1977, served as a head from 1986 to his retirement in 1993. He edited bimonthly, Kavilok of Gujarati poetry, since 1976 which he joined in 1969 as co-editor. He served as president of Gujarati Sahitya Parishad from December 2013 to December 2014. He also edited Kumar since 1991.

He married Kamla Parikh (née Patel) in 1964. He died on 9 May 2021, in Ahmedabad.

Works
His first work published in 1951 was a short story titled Pehlu Rudan. His short story collection Kantakni Khushbo (1964) has twenty two stories. His other story collection is Parajit Vijay. Ughad (1979) is a collection of poetry. Ang Pachisi (1982) is a collection of twenty five traditional Chhappa styled sarcastic poems. Aagiya (1982) is a collection of haiku. His other poetry collections are Hari Chadya Adfete, Shikhare Betha Chhe Sthitipragnya (2003), Station ane Train (2007).

He wrote biography of Rajendra Shah under Gujarati Granthkar Shreni and published in 1977.  Rasyug ma Prakritinirupan (Nature in medieval literature of Raas, 1978) is his research thesis. Atratya Tatratya (1978) is a collection of introductory essays on poets which include Gujarati poets along with C. K. Louis, W. H. Auden, Pablo Neruda, Eugenio Montale and Yevgeny Yevtushenko. Narsinh Mehta (1981) is a biography of Narsinh Mehta. Kharakshar (1982) has short introduction of several Gujarati authors including Dayaram, Dalpatram, Narmad, Priyakant Maniyar, Jagdish Joshi, Manilal Desai. Kaalma Korya Naam (1977) is a collection of short biographies including Yasunari Kawabata, Ishwar Chandra Vidyasagar, Charles Dickens, Dalpatram, Pujya Mota.

Samkalin Kavio (1983) is criticism of poetry of contemporary poets including Labhshankar Thakar, Sitanshu Yashaschandra, Rajendra Shukla, Ravji Patel, Adil Mansuri. Paravartan (1985), Prayogshil Sarjak Nhanalal (1987), Amar Brahmana Alokma, Ubhayanvaya  (1986) are works of criticism. He edited several books, Nishkulanand Padavali (1981), Saar Mahakavyo (1983), Panch Mahakavyo (1984) and T. S. Eliot (1989). Tulnatmak Sahitya (1984) is a work on comparative literature. He translated Divine Comedy in 1985.

Awards
He was awarded Kumar Chandrak in 1971, Swami Sachchidanand Sanman in 2004, Premanand Suvarna Chandrak in 2006 and Ranjitram Suvarna Chandrak in 2008.

See also
 List of Gujarati-language writers

References

External links
 

1933 births
2021 deaths
Poets from Gujarat
Gujarati people
Gujarati-language writers
Indian male poets
Gujarati-language poets
20th-century Indian poets
Indian magazine editors
Recipients of the Ranjitram Suvarna Chandrak
20th-century Indian male writers
Gujarat University alumni
Academic staff of Gujarat University
People from Ahmedabad district
Comparative literature academics